The 2003 Greek Cup Final was the 59th final of the Greek Cup. The match took place on 17 May 2003, at Toumba Stadium. The contesting teams were PAOK and Aris. It was PAOK's sixteenth Greek Cup Final in their 77-year history and Aris' sixth Greek Cup Final in their 89 years of existence. During the postgame press conference, Aris manager Giorgos Foiros made a complaint that the final should have been a two-legged tie because PAOK had the advantage of playing on home ground. Kaftanzoglio Stadium, a neutral ground and Thessaloniki's largest stadium was under renovation for the 2004 Summer Olympic games. The HFF's regulation for that season's Cup stated that if the final was to be held at Thessaloniki (that would be the case if at least one of the two finalists was a Thessaloniki 's team), it would be hosted at the second largest stadium of the city which was Toumba. About a week before the game, Aris demanded from the federation either the final to be played at Kalamaria Stadium or Makedonikos Stadium which were both neutral grounds (with much smaller capacity though) or to be held a draw between Toumba Stadium and Kleanthis Vikelidis Stadium (Aris home ground), but both requests were denied due to the tournament's regulation. PAOK manager, Angelos Anastasiadis became the only one in club's history to win the Cup both as a player, in 1974 and manager.

Venue

This was the first Greek Cup Final held at the Toumba Stadium (Toumba also hosted the first leg of the 1992 two-legged final between PAOK and Olympiacos).

The Toumba Stadium was built in 1959 and was renovated five times, in 1998, 1962, 1965, 1972 and 2000. The stadium is used as a venue for PAOK and was used for Greece in various occasions. Its current capacity is 28,701.

Background
PAOK had reached the Greek Cup Final fifteen times, winning three of them. The last time that had played in a Final was in 2001, where they had won Olympiacos by 4–2.

Aris had reached the Greek Cup Final five times, winning one of them. The last time that had played in a Final was in 1970, where they had won PAOK by 1–0.

Route to the final

Match

Details

See also
2002–03 Greek Football Cup

References

2003
Cup Final
Greek Cup Final 2003
Greek Cup Final 2003
Sports competitions in Thessaloniki
May 2003 sports events in Europe